Shanghai Hong Qiao International School (HQIS-RBIS) is an international school in Gubei, Shanghai. Its previous campus was in proximity to the Shanghai Zoo.

History 
The school opened its doors in 1997 as Rainbow Bridge International School with just two classes serving 18 preschool students. Since then, the student population has steadily increased. In 2003 the Elementary School opened. In 2012 HQIS became an International Baccalaureate (IB) World School authorized to teach the Primary Years Program (PYP). In 2014 the Middle School opened and the following year the school moved to its new campus and change its name to Hong Qiao International School.

Curriculum 
The IB-PYP program begins in Pre-School and goes through to Grade 5. At Middle and High School, the school offers a holistic program guided by three pillars of learning: Academic Rigor, 21-Century Skills, and Living Environment. The three pillars are supported by courses based on American curriculum standards, with Advanced Placement (AP) as the capstone.

Philosophy and Values 
HQIS emphasizes inquiry teaching and learning. Students are immersed in an educational environment that cultivates critical thinking and problem solving. The school is committed to renewability and the importance of taking responsibility for the well-being and care of the planet and its resources. These values are celebrated during the school’s major events, the Family Picnic and The Earth Day.

External links 
 www.hqis.org

References 

International schools in Shanghai